Epermenia parasitica is a moth in the family Epermeniidae. It was described by Edward Meyrick in 1930. It is found on Java in Indonesia.

The wingspan is 8–9 mm. The forewings are grey whitish, with the apex of scales dark grey, forming a close rather irregular striolation, more or less largely suffused with ochreous brown except anteriorly. There are three small black dots in a longitudinal row in the disc from one-fourth to three-fourths and several dark grey transverse spots from the costa, as well as a black apical dot. The hindwings are grey.

References

Epermeniidae
Moths described in 1930
Moths of Indonesia